There are several museums named War of 1812 museum:

Flag House & Star-Spangled Banner Museum in Baltimore, Maryland.
War of 1812 Museum (Plattsburgh) in Plattsburgh, New York.